St Andrew's School is an independent preparatory school in the hamlet of Buckhold, near Pangbourne, Berkshire, England. Together with its 'Pre-Prep – Early Years' department, the school educates girls and boys aged between three and thirteen. In 2011, there were 266 children at the school, of whom 155 were boys and 111 were girls.
The school has a Christian ethos, and its chapel services are reported to be "broadly Anglican in style". The most important religious event of the school year is the Advent Carol Service, which because of the numbers attending is held not at the school but in the larger chapel of nearby Bradfield College.

Scholarships are awarded to some children above the age of eleven, based on merit. St Andrew's has a School Council to involve its children in decisions affecting them.

In March 2011 an Independent Schools Inspectorate report endorsed the school's success.

History
The school was founded in 1934 as a boarding school for boys, and consisted of just two staff and eight boys. Historically, as the school grew, boys would leave to go onto schools such as Eton, Harrow and Winchester, however its ties with these schools slowly deteriorated after it first admitted girls in 1971, going on to become fully co-educational. The school's main building, a listed Victorian Gothic country house called Buckhold, which was designed by Alfred Waterhouse in 1885 for Herbert Watney, is set in fifty-four acres of woods and playing fields.

Catherine, Princess of Wales
The school's most famous alumna is Catherine "Kate" Middleton. Following her family's return to Berkshire from Amman when she was four years old, Middleton was enrolled at St Andrew's, and she boarded part-weekly at the school in her later years. It was at this school in 1991 that Middleton first saw her future husband, Prince William, when he was part of a Ludgrove School hockey team that came to play a match at Middleton's school.

The school today

The school has just under 300 pupils. It is co-educational. Its facilities include boarding houses, three science laboratories, music school, art studio and carpentry workshop, and a chapel. Sporting facilities include a 25-metre pool, all-weather astro playing field, sports hall, climbing wall, 9 hole golf course, 3 tennis courts (including one grass court) and rugby/football/cricket/lacrosse pitches.

Notable former pupils

Former students of the school are called "Old St Andrew's", and there is an OSA Association.
 Adrian Liddell Hart, author and adventurer
 Adam Boulton, journalist, broadcaster and author
 John le Carré (David Cornwell), spy fiction writer
 Sir Howard Hodgkin, artist
 Adam Hart-Davis, broadcaster
 Will Lyons (born 1976), journalist, broadcaster and wine writer
 Catherine, Princess of Wales, wife of William, Prince of Wales
 James Middleton, businessman
 Pippa Middleton, events manager, columnist

Notable staff
13th Earl of Westmeath

Headmasters
 1934 – 1954: R. W. Robertson-Glasgow
 1934 – 1945: Bill Ward-Clark
 1945 – 1975: Jack Llewellyn-Smith
 1952 – 1970: Rodney Stebbing
 1949 – 1952: Bill Berkley
 1975(?)- 1985: Bill Philipps
 1985 – 1995: Bob Acheson
 1995 – 2009: Jeremy Snow
 2009 – 2015: Dr David Livingstone
2015 – 2021: Jonathan R. Bartlett
2021–Present: Edward Graham

Notes

External links
 Official website
 Profile on the ISC website
 Independent Schools Inspectorate Report (March 2011)

Private schools in West Berkshire District
Educational institutions established in 1934
1934 establishments in England
Boarding schools in Berkshire
Preparatory schools in Berkshire
Church of England private schools in the Diocese of Oxford
Bradfield, Berkshire